The crested-tailed deer mouse (Habromys lophurus) is a species of rodent in the family Cricetidae found in El Salvador, Guatemala, and Mexico.

References

Habromys
Rodents of Central America
Mammals of Mexico
Near threatened fauna of North America
Mammals described in 1904
Taxonomy articles created by Polbot